The 1940 Titleholders Championship was contested from January 16–19 at Augusta Country Club. It was the 4th edition of the Titleholders Championship.

This event was won by Helen Hicks.

Final leaderboard

Source

References

Titleholders Championship
Golf in Georgia (U.S. state)
Titleholders Championship
Titleholders Championship
Titleholders Championship
Titleholders Championship
Women's sports in Georgia (U.S. state)